Scarus ghobban, also known as the blue-barred parrotfish, blue trim parrotfish, cream parrotfish, globe-headed parrotfish, green blotched parrotfish, yellow scale parrotfish, and bluechin parrotfish, is a species of marine ray-finned fish in the family Scaridae.

Description

This species is blue-green to green in colour and commonly grows to approximately 46 cm. Its appearance is variable. It may have a central stripe on the dorsal and anal fins that is pink in color. The underside of the body may be pinkish or yellowish. There may be blue markings around the area of the pectoral fin.

Distribution
Scarus ghobban is widespread throughout the Indo-Pacific, known from East Africa to Indonesia. It also occurs in the Galápagos Islands as well as Japan, south to Australia and east to French Polynesia. Recently recorded in 2001 for the first time in the Mediterranean Sea off Israel, following an entry via the Suez Canal, it is now expanding northward in Levantine waters where it remains rare.

Like other reef fish with a pelagic larval phase, regional currents facilitate high levels of gene flow, which in turn create high genetic diversity among the species.

Habitat
Scarus Ghobban occurs in places with sandy bottoms and in areas with seagrass. It is also known to live in marginal reefs and in deeper waters.

Ecology
Scarus ghobban grows quickly and can live up to 13 years. It tends to congregate in small schools. Scarus ghobban can rotate their mandible bone at a high velocity; this allows them to function as a scraper and facilitate hydrological transport of fine sediments.

'''Reproduction
The way the scarus ghobban reproduces is by the female laying eggs into the current of the water. After about 25 hours after the egg has been fertilized, it'll hatch. After birth, the parrotfish will mature quickly and won't have to be near its parents for much time.

Threats
While the species is captured in large numbers by fishermen for consumption and sale, and there is also a high amount of bycatch from other fisheries, it is not particularly targeted and appears not to be threatened at this point. As other parrotfish, it is dependent on coral reefs to some degree, and is likely to suffer from the continued degradation of same.

References

External links
 

ghobban
Fish described in 1775
Taxa named by Peter Forsskål